The Takeover Code, or more formally The City Code on Takeovers and Mergers, is a binding set of rules that apply to listed companies in the United Kingdom, such as those trading on the London Stock Exchange. Many of its provisions are mirrored in the EU Takeover Directive.

Contents
The code is designed principally to ensure that shareholders are treated fairly and are not denied an opportunity to decide on the merits of a takeover and that shareholders of the same class are afforded equivalent treatment by an offeror. The code also provides an orderly framework within which takeovers are conducted.

Rule 3, who may advise shareholders on offers or approaches
Rule 6, acquisitions requiring offer of a minimum level of consideration
Rule 9, when a mandatory offer is required, and who is responsible to make it
Rule 10, offer can be declared unconditional once the offeror holds over 50% of the voting shares of the offeree
Rule 11, when cash or securities are required as the offer
Rule 14, where there is more than one share capital class
Rule 16, special deals with favourable conditions
Rule 21, actions that could have the effect of frustrating a takeover bid require shareholder approval
Rule 21.3, information provided by the board of the offeree to the recommended offeror must be available to a competing offeror (if one approaches)
Rule 31.4, offer to remain open for 14 days after unconditional as to acceptances
Rule 32.3, if the offer is revised all shareholders are entitled to reconsider
Rule 33.2, shutting off cash underwritten alternatives
Rule 36, for partial offers, the panel's consent is required
Rule 37, regulating a company's purchase of own securities

Links

 Rule 3 adviser
 Designated Professional Body

See also
Mergers and acquisitions in United Kingdom law
Takeover Panel
Hogg v Cramphorn Ltd [1967] Ch 254
Howard Smith Ltd v Ampol Petroleum Ltd [1974] AC 821
Imperial Group Pension Trust Ltd v Imperial Tobacco Ltd [1991] 11 ILRM 66, poison pill defence
R v Panel for Takeovers and Mergers Ex p Datafin [1987] QB 815

References

PL Davies, E Schuster and E Van de Walle de Ghelcke, 'The Takeover Directive as a Protectionist Tool?' (2010) EGCI Working Paper
D Kershaw, 'The Illusion of Importance' (2007)  56 ICLQ 267
Richard Wachmann, 'CBI argues for takeover code to be tightened' (27 July 2010) The Guardian

External links
City Code on Takeovers and Mergers
The Takeover Panel website

Economy of the City of London
Mergers and acquisitions
Corporate governance in the United Kingdom